Rakesh Prithviraj Tandon (born 27 February 1953) is a former cricketer who played first-class cricket in India from 1969 to 1977.

Rakesh Tandon was a leg-spin bowler, lower-order batsman and fine close-in fielder.  His best bowling figures were 6 for 34 for Central Zone against North Zone in the Duleep Trophy in 1971-72, when he and Salim Durani dismissed North Zone for 85. His highest score was 142 not out for Bombay against Baroda in the Ranji Trophy in 1976-77. He played in two matches for India against the visiting Sri Lankan team in 1975-76 in the days before Sri Lanka achieved Test status.

References

External links
 
 Rakesh Tandon at CricketArchive

1953 births
Living people
Cricketers from Bangalore
Indian cricketers
Vidarbha cricketers
Mumbai cricketers
Central Zone cricketers
West Zone cricketers